This is a list of episodes of the PBS children's television series Fetch! with Ruff Ruffman.

Series overview

Season 1 (2006)
Season 1 premiered on May 29, 2006.

Contestants
 Julia Citrin
 Noah Ellis
 Khalil Flemming
 Taylor Garron
 Brian McGoff
 Anna Sheridan

Episodes

Point Totals Before Finale
 Anna – 1,421 points
 Noah – 1,420 points
 Khalil – 1,415 points
 Julia – 1,406 points
 Brian – 1,405 points
 Taylor – 1,400 points

Points Chart

  Fetcher stayed in Studio for that episode
 Fetcher was the winner for the day

Final Results
 Season 1 Champion: Anna
 2nd Place: Khalil
 3rd Place: Noah
 4th Place: Brian
 5th Place: Julia
 6th Place: Taylor

Season 2 (2007)
Season 2 premiered on May 28, 2007.

Contestants
 Madison "Madi" Bader
 William "Willie" Bornkessel
 Rosario Corso
 Bridget O'Sullivan
 Michael "Mike" Spence
 Nina Wadekar

Episodes

Point Totals Before Finale
 Mike – 1,325 points
 Rosario – 1,320 points
 Bridget – 1,315 points
 Willie – 1,305 points
 Nina – 1,290 points
 Madi – 1,285 points

Points Chart

 Fetcher stayed in Studio for that Episode
 Fetcher was the winner for the day

Final Results 
 Season 2 Champion: Mike
 2nd Place: Willie
 3rd Place: Bridget
 4th Place: Rosario
 5th Place: Madi
 6th Place: Nina

Season 3 (2008)
Season 3 premiered on September 29, 2008 and is the last season to be presented in Standard Definition.

Contestants
 Harsha Amaravadi
 Jay Brosnan
 Samuel "Sam" Blumenfeld
 Samantha "Sammy" Boucher
 Demetrius Joseph "DJ" Thomas
 Noel Um

Episodes

Point Totals Before Finale
 Harsha – 1,365 points
 Jay – 1,355 points
 Sammy – 1,350 points
 Sam – 1,335 points
 Noel – 1,330 points
 DJ – 1,330 points

Points Chart

 Fetcher stayed in studio for that episode
 Fetcher was the winner for the day

Final Results
 Season 3 Champion: Jay
 2nd Place: Harsha
 3rd Place: Noel
 4th Place: Sammy
 5th Place: Sam
 6th Place: DJ

Season 4 (2009)
Season 4 premiered on September 11, 2009 and is the first season to be presented in High Definition.

Contestants
 Isaac Bean
 Brian Conroy
 Liza Giangrande
 Bethany Owens
 Talia Patapoutian
 Sterling Singletary

Episodes

Point Totals Before Finale
 Talia	– 1,255 points
 Sterling – 1,252.5 points
 Isaac	– 1,237.5 points
 Liza – 1,215 points
 Brian	– 1,205 points
 Bethany – 1,182.5 points

Points Chart

 Fetcher Stayed in Studio for that episode
 Fetcher was the winner for the day

Final Results
 Season 4 Champion: Liza
 2nd Place: Isaac
 3rd Place: Talia
 4th Place: Sterling
 5th Place: Brian
 6th Place: Bethany

Season 5 (2010)
Season 5 premiered on October 4, 2010.

Contestants
 Rubye Peyser
 Emeline "Emmie" Atwood
 Marc "Marco" Frongillo
 Marc Prophet
 Jay Ricco
 Shreya Viswanathan

Episodes

Point Totals Before Finale
 Rubye – 1,307 points
 Emmie – 1,306 points
 Shreya – 1,295 points
 Marc – 1,291 points
 Jay – 1,287 points
 Marco – 1,265 points

Points Chart

 Fetcher Stayed in Studio for that episode
 Fetcher was the winner for the day

Final Results
 Season 5 Champion: Marco
 2nd Place: Emmie
 3rd Place: Rubye
 4th Place: Shreya
 5th Place: Marc
 6th Place: Jay

References

Fetch with Ruff Ruffman episodes lists of